Kamala Devi (8 October 1933 – 29 November 2010) was an actress of Indian and British parentage, best known for her roles in the 1960s opposite her then-husband, Chuck Connors. She was born in Bombay (the current Mumbai) in British India. 
Her mother, Elizabeth, 
was of English-Welsh descent, and her father, Chandumal Amesur, was an Indian head-and-neck surgeon.

In 1963, she married Connors, and they were divorced in 1972.

Devi became a US citizen on 2 December 1966.

In 2005, she married Maurie Beaumont, her third husband, who died in 2008.

Kamala Devi died in Arlington County, Virginia at age 77 on 29 November 2010.

Filmography and television series

References

External links
 
Clippings about Kamala Devi and Chuck Connors

Living people
1934 births
Indian film actresses
Indian people of British descent
Indian people of English descent
Indian people of Welsh descent
Actresses from Mumbai
Indian emigrants to the United States
American actresses of Indian descent
21st-century American women
Naturalized citizens of the United States